The men's 100m freestyle events at the 2022 World Para Swimming Championships were held at the Penteada Olympic Swimming Complex in Madeira between 12 and 18 June.

Medalists

Results

S3
Heats
11 swimmers from 7 nations took part. The swimmers with the top eight times, regardless of heat, advanced to the final.

Final
The final was held on 18 June 2022.

S4

Final
Eight swimmers from eight nations took part

S5
Heats
13 swimmers from 10 nations took part. The swimmers with the top eight times, regardless of heat, advanced to the final.

S6
Heats
11 swimmers from 11 nations took part. The swimmers with the top eight times, regardless of heat, advanced to the final.

Final
The final was held on 13 June 2022.

S7
Final
The final was held on 18 June 2022.

S8
Heats
15 swimmers from 11 nations took part. The swimmers with the top eight times, regardless of heat, advanced to the final.

Final
The final was held on 15 June 2022.

S9
Heats
12 swimmers from 9 nations took part. The swimmers with the top eight times, regardless of heat, advanced to the final.

Final
The final was held on 15 June 2022.

S10
Heats
10 swimmers from 10 nations took part. The swimmers with the top eight times, regardless of heat, advanced to the final.

Final
The final was held on 17 June 2022.

S11
Heats
13 swimmers from 11 nations took part. The swimmers with the top eight times, regardless of heat, advanced to the final.

Final
The final was held on 16 June 2022.

S12
Final
Five swimmers from four nations took part

S13
Heats
14 swimmers from 9 nations took part. The swimmers with the top eight times, regardless of heat, advanced to the final.

Final
The final was held on 14 June 2022.

References

2022 World Para Swimming Championships